Raymond L. "Ray" Pavlak (March 6, 1926 – April 1, 1994) was an American judge and politician.

From South St. Paul, Minnesota, Pavlak graduated from South St. Paul High School. He served in the United States Navy during World War II. Pavlak graduated from the University of St. Thomas and received his law degree from William Mitchell College of Law. He then practiced law. From 1965 until 1974, Pavlak served in the Minnesota House of Representatives and was a Democrat. In 1974, Pavlak was appointed Minnesota District Court judge and served until his retirement in 1994. Pavlak died at his home in South St. Paul. Minnesota.

Notes

1926 births
1994 deaths
People from South St. Paul, Minnesota
University of St. Thomas (Minnesota) alumni
William Mitchell College of Law alumni
Minnesota state court judges
Democratic Party members of the Minnesota House of Representatives
20th-century American judges
20th-century American politicians